Proto-Germanic (abbreviated PGmc; also called Common Germanic) is the reconstructed proto-language of the Germanic branch of the Indo-European languages.

Proto-Germanic eventually developed from pre-Proto-Germanic into three Germanic branches during the fifth century BC to fifth century AD: West Germanic, East Germanic and North Germanic, which however remained in contact over a considerable time, especially the Ingvaeonic languages (including English), which arose from West Germanic dialects and remained in continued contact with North Germanic.

A defining feature of Proto-Germanic is the completion of the process described by Grimm's law, a set of sound changes that occurred between its status as a dialect of Proto-Indo-European and its gradual divergence into a separate language. As it is probable that the development of this sound shift spanned a considerable time (several centuries), Proto-Germanic cannot adequately be reconstructed as a simple node in a tree model but rather represents a phase of development that may span close to a thousand years. The end of the Common Germanic period is reached with the beginning of the Migration Period in the fourth century.

The alternative term "Germanic parent language" may be used to include a larger scope of linguistic developments, spanning the Nordic Bronze Age and Pre-Roman Iron Age in Northern Europe (second to first millennia BC) to include "Pre-Germanic" (PreGmc), "Early Proto Germanic" (EPGmc) and "Late Proto-Germanic" (LPGmc). While Proto-Germanic refers only to the reconstruction of the most recent common ancestor of Germanic languages, the Germanic parent language refers to the entire journey that the dialect of Proto-Indo-European that would become Proto-Germanic underwent through the millennia.

The Proto-Germanic language is not directly attested by any coherent surviving texts; it has been reconstructed using the comparative method. However, there is fragmentary direct attestation of (late) Proto-Germanic in early runic inscriptions (specifically the second-century AD Vimose inscriptions and the second-century BC Negau helmet inscription), and in Roman Empire-era transcriptions of individual words (notably in Tacitus' Germania,  AD 90).

Archaeology and early historiography

Some sources also give a date of 750 BC for the earliest expansion out of southern Scandinavia and northern Germany along the North Sea coast towards the mouth of the Rhine.

Proto-Germanic developed out of pre-Proto-Germanic during the Pre-Roman Iron Age of Northern Europe. According to the Germanic substrate hypothesis, it may have been influenced by non-Indo-European cultures, such as the Funnelbeaker culture, but the sound change in the Germanic languages known as Grimm's law points to a non-substratic development away from other branches of Indo-European. Proto-Germanic itself was likely spoken after  500 BC, and Proto-Norse from the second century AD and later is still quite close to reconstructed Proto-Germanic, but other common innovations separating Germanic from Proto-Indo-European suggest a common history of pre-Proto-Germanic speakers throughout the Nordic Bronze Age.

According to Musset (1965), the Proto-Germanic language developed in southern Scandinavia (Denmark, south Sweden and southern Norway) and the northern-most part of Germany in  schleswig holstein  and northern Lower Saxony,the Urheimat (original home) of the Germanic tribes. It is possible that Indo-European speakers first arrived in southern Scandinavia with the Corded Ware culture in the mid-3rd millennium BC, developing into the Nordic Bronze Age cultures by the early second millennium BC. According to Mallory, Germanicists "generally agree" that the Urheimat ('original homeland') of the Proto-Germanic language, the ancestral idiom of all attested Germanic dialects, was primarily situated in an area corresponding to the extent of the Jastorf culture.

Early Germanic expansion in the Pre-Roman Iron Age (fifth to first centuries BC) placed Proto-Germanic speakers in contact with the Continental Celtic La Tène horizon. A number of Celtic loanwords in Proto-Germanic have been identified. By the first century AD, Germanic expansion reached the Danube and the Upper Rhine in the south and the Germanic peoples first entered the historical record. At about the same time, extending east of the Vistula (Oksywie culture, Przeworsk culture), Germanic speakers came into contact with early Slavic cultures, as reflected in early Germanic loans in Proto-Slavic.

The period marks the breakup of Late Proto-Germanic and the beginning of the (historiographically recorded) Germanic migrations. The first coherent text recorded in a Germanic language is the Gothic Bible, written in the later fourth century in the language of the Thervingi Gothic Christians, who had escaped persecution by moving from Scythia to Moesia in 348.

The earliest available coherent texts (conveying complete sentences, including verbs) in Proto-Norse are variably dated to the 2nd century AD, around 300 AD or the first century AD in runic inscriptions (such as the Tune Runestone). The delineation of Late Common Germanic from Proto-Norse at about that time is largely a matter of convention. Early West Germanic text is available from the fifth century, beginning with the Frankish Bergakker inscription.

Evolution
The evolution of Proto-Germanic from its ancestral forms, beginning with its ancestor Proto-Indo-European, began with the development of a separate common way of speech among some geographically nearby speakers of a prior language and ended with the dispersion of the proto-language speakers into distinct populations with mostly independent speech habits. Between the two points, many sound changes occurred.

Theories of phylogeny

Solutions
Phylogeny as applied to historical linguistics involves the evolutionary descent of languages. The phylogeny problem is the question of what specific tree, in the tree model of language evolution, best explains the paths of descent of all the members of a language family from a common language, or proto-language (at the root of the tree) to the attested languages (at the leaves of the tree). The Germanic languages form a tree with Proto-Germanic at its root that is a branch of the Indo-European tree, which in turn has Proto-Indo-European at its root. Borrowing of lexical items from contact languages makes the relative position of the Germanic branch within Indo-European less clear than the positions of the other branches of Indo-European. In the course of the development of historical linguistics, various solutions have been proposed, none certain and all debatable.

In the evolutionary history of a language family, philologists consider a genetic "tree model" appropriate only if communities do not remain in effective contact as their languages diverge. Early Indo-European had limited contact between distinct lineages, and, uniquely, the Germanic subfamily exhibited a less treelike behaviour, as some of its characteristics were acquired from neighbours early in its evolution rather than from its direct ancestors. The internal diversification of West Germanic developed in an especially non-treelike manner.

Proto-Germanic is generally agreed to have begun about 500 BC. Its hypothetical ancestor between the end of Proto-Indo-European and 500 BC is termed Pre-Proto-Germanic. Whether it is to be included under a wider meaning of Proto-Germanic is a matter of usage.

Winfred P. Lehmann regarded Jacob Grimm's "First Germanic Sound Shift", or Grimm's law, and Verner's law, (which pertained mainly to consonants and were considered for many decades to have generated Proto-Germanic) as pre-Proto-Germanic and held that the "upper boundary" (that is, the earlier boundary) was the fixing of the accent, or stress, on the root syllable of a word, typically on the first syllable. Proto-Indo-European had featured a moveable pitch-accent consisting of "an alternation of high and low tones" as well as stress of position determined by a set of rules based on the lengths of a word's syllables.

The fixation of the stress led to sound changes in unstressed syllables. For Lehmann, the "lower boundary" was the dropping of final -a or -e in unstressed syllables; for example, post-PIE  > Gothic , 'knows'.  Elmer H. Antonsen agreed with Lehmann about the upper boundary but later found runic evidence that the -a was not dropped: ékwakraz … wraita, 'I, Wakraz, … wrote (this)'. He says: "We must therefore search for a new lower boundary for Proto-Germanic."

Antonsen's own scheme divides Proto-Germanic into an early stage and a late stage. The early stage includes the stress fixation and resulting "spontaneous vowel-shifts" while the late stage is defined by ten complex rules governing changes of both vowels and consonants.

By 250 BC Proto-Germanic had branched into five groups of Germanic: two each in the West and the North and one in the East.

Phonological stages from Proto-Indo-European to end of Proto-Germanic

The following changes are known or presumed to have occurred in the history of Proto-Germanic in the wider sense from the end of Proto-Indo-European up to the point that Proto-Germanic began to break into mutually unintelligible dialects. The changes are listed roughly in chronological order, with changes that operate on the outcome of earlier ones appearing later in the list. Ringe in turn summarizes standard concepts and terminology.

Pre-Proto-Germanic (Pre-PGmc)
This stage began with the separation of a distinct speech, perhaps while it was still forming part of the Proto-Indo-European dialect continuum. It contained many innovations that were shared with other Indo-European branches to various degrees, probably through areal contacts, and mutual intelligibility with other dialects would have remained for some time. It was nevertheless on its own path, whether dialect or language.

Early Proto-Germanic
This stage began its evolution as a dialect of Proto-Indo-European that had lost its laryngeals and had five long and six short vowels as well as one or two overlong vowels. The consonant system was still that of PIE minus palatovelars and laryngeals, but the loss of syllabic resonants already made the language markedly different from PIE proper. Mutual intelligibility might have still existed with other descendants of PIE, but it would have been strained, and the period marked the definitive break of Germanic from the other Indo-European languages and the beginning of Germanic proper, containing most of the sound changes that are now held to define this branch distinctively. This stage contained various consonant and vowel shifts, the loss of the contrastive accent inherited from PIE for a uniform accent on the first syllable of the word root, and the beginnings of the reduction of the resulting unstressed syllables.

Late Proto-Germanic
By this stage, Germanic had emerged as a distinctive branch and had undergone many of the sound changes that would make its later descendants recognisable as Germanic languages. It had shifted its consonant inventory from a system that was rich in plosives to one containing primarily fricatives, had lost the PIE mobile pitch accent for a predictable stress accent, and had merged two of its vowels. The stress accent had already begun to cause the erosion of unstressed syllables, which would continue in its descendants. The final stage of the language included the remaining development until the breakup into dialects and, most notably, featured the development of nasal vowels and the start of umlaut, another characteristic Germanic feature.

Lexical evidence in other language varieties
Loans into Proto-Germanic from other (known) languages or from Proto-Germanic into other languages can be dated relative to each other by which Germanic sound laws have acted on them. Since the dates of borrowings and sound laws are not precisely known, it is not possible to use loans to establish absolute or calendar chronology.

Loans from adjoining Indo-European groups

Most loans from Celtic appear to have been made before or during the Germanic Sound Shift. For instance, one specimen  'ruler' was borrowed from Celtic  'king' (stem ), with g → k. It is clearly not native because PIE *ē → ī is typical not of Germanic but Celtic languages. Another is  'foreigner; Celt' from the Celtic tribal name Volcae with k → h and o → a. Other likely Celtic loans include  'servant',  'mailshirt',  'hostage',  'iron',  'healer',  'lead',  'Rhine', and  'fortified enclosure'. These loans would likely have been borrowed during the Celtic Hallstatt and early La Tène cultures when the Celts dominated central Europe, although the period spanned several centuries.

From East Iranian came  'hemp' (compare Khotanese , Ossetian  'flax'),  'hops' (compare Osset ),  'sheep' (compare Pers  'yearling kid'),  'tunic' (cf. Osset  'shirt'),  'cottage' (compare Pers  'house'),  'cloak',  'path' (compare Avestan , gen. ), and  'work' (compare Av ). The words could have been transmitted directly by the Scythians from the Ukraine plain, groups of whom entered Central Europe via the Danube and created the Vekerzug Culture in the Carpathian Basin (sixth to fifth centuries BC), or by later contact with Sarmatians, who followed the same route. Unsure is  'horse', which was either borrowed directly from Scytho-Sarmatian or through Celtic mediation.

Loans into non-Germanic languages

Numerous loanwords believed to have been borrowed from Proto-Germanic are known in the non-Germanic languages spoken in areas adjacent to the Germanic languages.

The heaviest influence has been on the Finnic languages, which have received hundreds of Proto-Germanic or pre-Proto-Germanic loanwords. Well-known examples include PGmc  'warlord' (compare Finnish ),  (later ) 'ring' (compare Finnish , Estonian ),  'king' (Finnish ),  'lamb' (Finnish ),  'ransom' (Finnish ).

Loanwords into the Samic languages, Baltic languages and Slavic languages are also known.

Non-Indo-European substrate elements

The term substrate with reference to Proto-Germanic refers to lexical items and phonological elements that do not appear to be descended from Proto-Indo-European. The substrate theory postulates that the elements came from an earlier population that stayed amongst the Indo-Europeans and was influential enough to bring over some elements of its own language. The theory of a non-Indo-European substrate was first proposed by Sigmund Feist, who estimated that about a third of all Proto-Germanic lexical items came from the substrate.

Theo Vennemann has hypothesized a Basque substrate and a Semitic superstrate in Germanic; however, his speculations, too, are generally rejected by specialists in the relevant fields.

Phonology

Transcription
The following conventions are used in this article for transcribing Proto-Germanic reconstructed forms:
In other literature, they may be written as graphemes with a bar to produce ƀ, đ, ǥ.
 Unvoiced fricatives appear as f, þ, h (perhaps ,).  may have become  in certain positions at a later stage of Proto-Germanic itself.
 Labiovelars appear as kw, hw, gw; this does not imply any particular analysis as single sounds (e.g. ,) or clusters (e.g. ,).
 The yod sound appears as j . Note that the normal convention for representing this sound in Proto-Indo-European is y; the use of j does not imply any actual change in the pronunciation of the sound.
 Long vowels are denoted with a macron over the letter, e.g. ō.
 Overlong vowels appear with circumflexes, e.g. ô. In other literature they are often denoted by a doubled macron, e.g. ō̄.
 Nasal vowels are written here with an ogonek, following Don Ringe's usage, e.g. ǫ̂ . Most commonly in literature, they are denoted simply by a following n. Tildes (ã, ĩ, ũ...) are also used in some sources.
 Diphthongs appear as ai, au, eu, iu, ōi, ōu and perhaps ēi, ēu. However, when immediately followed by the corresponding semivowel, they appear as ajj, aww, eww, iww. u is written as w when between a vowel and j.
 Long vowels followed by a non-high vowel were separate syllables and are written as such here, except for ī, which is written ij in that case.

Consonants
The table below lists the consonantal phonemes of Proto-Germanic, ordered and classified by their reconstructed pronunciation. The slashes around the phonemes are omitted for clarity. When two phonemes appear in the same box, the first of each pair is voiceless, the second is voiced. Phones written in parentheses represent allophones and are not themselves independent phonemes. For descriptions of the sounds and definitions of the terms, follow the links on the column and row headings.

Notes:
  was an allophone of  before velar obstruents.
  was an allophone of  before labiovelar obstruents.
 The phoneme written as f was probably still realised as a bilabial fricative in Proto-Germanic. Evidence for this is the fact that in Gothic, word-final b (which medially represents a voiced fricative) devoices to f and also Old Norse spellings such as aptr , where the letter p rather than the more usual f was used to denote the bilabial realisation before .

Grimm's and Verner's law

Grimm's law as applied to pre-proto-Germanic is a chain shift of the original Indo-European plosives. Verner's Law explains a category of exceptions to Grimm's Law, where a voiced fricative appears where Grimm's Law predicts a voiceless fricative. The discrepancy is conditioned by the placement of the original Indo-European word accent.

p, t, and k did not undergo Grimm's law after a fricative (such as s) or after other plosives (which were shifted to fricatives by the Germanic spirant law); for example, where Latin (with the original t) has stella 'star' and octō 'eight', Middle Dutch has ster and acht (with unshifted t). This original t merged with the shifted t from the voiced consonant; that is, most of the instances of  came from either the original  or the shifted .

(A similar shift on the consonant inventory of Proto-Germanic later generated High German. McMahon says:"Grimm's and Verner's Laws ... together form the First Germanic Consonant Shift. A second, and chronologically later Second Germanic Consonant Shift ... affected only Proto-Germanic voiceless stops ... and split Germanic into two sets of dialects, Low German in the north ... and High German further south ...")

The accent at the time of the change was the one inherited from Proto-Indo-European, which was free and could occur on any syllable. For example, PIE  > PGmc. 'brother' but PIE  > PGmc. 'mother'. The voicing of some  according to Verner's Law produced , a new phoneme. Sometime after Grimm's and Verner's law, Proto-Germanic lost its inherited contrastive accent, and all words became stressed on their root syllable. This was generally the first syllable unless a prefix was attached.

The loss of the Proto-Indo-European contrastive accent got rid of the conditioning environment for the consonant alternations created by Verner's law. Without this conditioning environment, the cause of the alternation was no longer obvious to native speakers. The alternations that had started as mere phonetic variants of sounds became increasingly grammatical in nature, leading to the grammatical alternations of sounds known as grammatischer Wechsel. For a single word, the grammatical stem could display different consonants depending on its grammatical case or its tense. As a result of the complexity of this system, significant levelling of these sounds occurred throughout the Germanic period as well as in the later daughter languages. Already in Proto-Germanic, most alternations in nouns were leveled to have only one sound or the other consistently throughout all forms of a word, although some alternations were preserved, only to be levelled later in the daughters (but differently in each one). Alternations in noun and verb endings were also levelled, usually in favour of the voiced alternants in nouns, but a split remained in verbs where unsuffixed (strong) verbs received the voiced alternants while suffixed (weak) verbs had the voiceless alternants. Alternation between the present and past of strong verbs remained common and was not levelled in Proto-Germanic, and survives up to the present day in some Germanic languages.

Allophones
Some of the consonants that developed from the sound shifts are thought to have been pronounced in different ways (allophones) depending on the sounds around them.

Many of the consonants listed in the table could appear lengthened or prolonged under some circumstances, which is inferred from their appearing in some daughter languages as doubled letters. This phenomenon is termed gemination. Kraehenmann says:"Then, Proto-Germanic already had long consonants … but they contrasted with short ones only word-medially. Moreover, they were not very frequent and occurred only intervocally almost exclusively after short vowels."

The pattern of allophony is not completely clear, but generally is similar to the patterns of voiced obstruent allophones in languages such as Spanish. Older accounts tended to suggest that the sounds were originally fricatives and later "hardened" into stops in some circumstances. However, Ringe notes that this belief was largely due to theory-internal considerations of older phonological theories, and in modern theories it is equally possible that the allophony was present from the beginning.

More specifically:
This is clearest from developments in Anglo-Frisian and other Ingvaeonic languages.
This was the only place where a voiced labiovelar  could still occur.
This rule continued to apply at least into the early West Germanic languages, since the West Germanic gemination produced geminated plosives from earlier voiced fricatives.

Labiovelars

Labiovelars were affected by the following additional changes:
This caused alternations in certain verb paradigms, e.g. 'to sing' versus   'they sang'. Apparently, this delabialization also occurred with labiovelars following , showing that the language possessed a labial allophone  as well.
 (Early) Proto-Germanic  knew at least three different outcomes: after , it was preserved (e.g. 'god',  'to grind'); in all other positions  usually became  (e.g. 'warm',  'snow',  'kidney'). Evidence for a sound change  >  in initial positions is slim.
These various changes often led to complex alternations, e.g.   'to see',   'they saw' (indicative),   'they saw' (subjunctive), which were reanalysed and regularised differently in the various daughter languages.

Consonant gradation
 posits a process of consonant mutation for Proto-Germanic, under the name consonant gradation. (This is distinct from the consonant mutation processes occurring in the neighboring Samic and Finnic languages, also known as consonant gradation since the 19th century.) The Proto-Germanic consonant gradation is not directly attested in any of the Germanic dialects, but may nevertheless be reconstructed on the basis of certain dialectal discrepancies in root of the n-stems and the ōn-verbs.

Diachronically, the rise of consonant gradation in Germanic can be explained by Kluge's law, by which geminates arose from stops followed by a nasal in a stressed syllable. Since this sound law only operated in part of the paradigms of the n-stems and ōn-verbs, it gave rise to an alternation of geminated and non-geminated consonants in the same paradigms. These were largely regularized by various ways of analogy in the Germanic daughter languages (e.g. Kroonen 2011).

Since its formulation, the validity of Kluge's Law has been contested. The development of geminate consonants has also been explained by the idea of "expressive gemination". Although this idea remains popular, it does not explain why many words containing geminated stops do not have "expressive" or "intensive" semantics. The idea has been described as "methodically unsound", because it attempts to explain the phonological phenomenon through psycholinguistic factors and other irregular behaviour instead of exploring regular sound laws.

The origin of the Germanic geminate consonants remains a disputed part of historical linguistics with no clear consensus at present.

The reconstruction of grading paradigms in Proto-Germanic explains root alternations such as Old English  'star' <  vs. Old Frisian  'id.' < * and Norwegian (dial.)  'to swing' <  vs. Middle High German  'id.' <  as generalizations of the original allomorphy. In the cases concerned, this would imply reconstructing an n-stem nom. , gen.  < PIE ,  and an ōn-verb 3sg. , 3pl.  < , .

Vowels
Proto-Germanic had four short vowels, five or six long vowels, and at least one "overlong" or "trimoric" vowel. The exact phonetic quality of the vowels is uncertain.

Notes:

  could not occur in unstressed syllables except before , where it may have been lowered to  already in late Proto-Germanic times.
 All nasal vowels except  and  occurred word-finally.

PIE ə, a, o merged into PGmc a; PIE ā, ō merged into PGmc ō. It is known that the raising of ā to ō can not have occurred earlier than the earliest contact between Proto-Germanic speakers and the Romans. It is explained by Ringe that at the time of borrowing, the vowel matching closest in sound to Latin ā was a Proto-Germanic ā-like vowel (which later became ō). And since Proto-Germanic therefore lacked a mid(-high) back vowel, the closest equivalent of Latin ō was Proto-Germanic ū:  >  >  > Gothic .

A new ā was formed following the shift from ā to ō when intervocalic  was lost in -aja- sequences. It was a rare phoneme, and occurred only in a handful of words, the most notable being the verbs of the third weak class. The agent noun suffix  (Modern English -er in words such as baker or teacher) was likely borrowed from Latin around or shortly after this time.

Diphthongs
The following diphthongs are known to have existed in Proto-Germanic:

This removed  (which became ) but created  from earlier .

Diphthongs in Proto-Germanic can also be analysed as sequences of a vowel plus an approximant, as was the case in Proto-Indo-European. This is also confirmed by the fact that later in the West Germanic gemination, -wj- is geminated to -wwj- in parallel with the other consonants (except ).

Overlong vowels

Proto-Germanic had two overlong or trimoraic long vowels ô  and ê , the latter mainly in adverbs (cf.  'whereto, whither'). None of the documented languages still include such vowels. Their reconstruction is due to the comparative method, particularly as a way of explaining an otherwise unpredictable two-way split of reconstructed long ō in final syllables, which unexpectedly remained long in some morphemes but shows normal shortening in others.

Trimoraic vowels generally occurred at morpheme boundaries where a bimoraic long vowel and a short vowel in hiatus contracted, especially after the loss of an intervening laryngeal (-VHV-). One example, without a laryngeal, includes the class II weak verbs (ō-stems) where a -j- was lost between vowels, so that -ōja → ōa → ô (cf.  →  → Gothic  'to anoint'). However, the majority occurred in word-final syllables (inflectional endings) probably because in this position the vowel could not be resyllabified. Additionally, Germanic, like Balto-Slavic, lengthened bimoraic long vowels in absolute final position, perhaps to better conform to a word's prosodic template; e.g., PGmc  'eagle' ← PIE * just as Lith  'stone', OSl kamy ←  ← PIE *. Contrast:
 contraction after loss of laryngeal: gen.pl.  'wolves' ←  ← pre-Gmc * ← PIE *; ō-stem gen.pl. * ← pre-Gmc * ← PIE *.
 contraction of short vowels: a-stem nom.pl.  'wolves' ← PIE *.

But vowels that were lengthened by laryngeals did not become overlong. Compare:
 ō-stem nom.sg. *-ō ← *-ā ← PIE *;
 ō-stem acc.sg. *-ǭ ← *-ān ← *-ām (by Stang's law) ← PIE *;
 ō-stem acc.pl. *-ōz ← *-āz ← *-ās (by Stang's law) ← PIE *;

Trimoraic vowels are distinguished from bimoraic vowels by their outcomes in attested Germanic languages: word-final trimoraic vowels remained long vowels while bimoraic vowels developed into short vowels. Older theories about the phenomenon claimed that long and overlong vowels were both long but differed in tone, i.e., ô and ê had a "circumflex" (rise-fall-rise) tone while ō and ē had an "acute" (rising) tone, much like the tones of modern Scandinavian languages, Baltic, and Ancient Greek, and asserted that this distinction was inherited from PIE. However, this view was abandoned since languages in general do not combine distinctive intonations on unstressed syllables with contrastive stress and vowel length. Modern theories have reinterpreted overlong vowels as having superheavy syllable weight (three moras) and therefore greater length than ordinary long vowels.

By the end of the Proto-Germanic period, word-final long vowels were shortened to short vowels. Following that, overlong vowels were shortened to regular long vowels in all positions, merging with originally long vowels except word-finally (because of the earlier shortening), so that they remained distinct in that position. This was a late dialectal development, because the result was not the same in all Germanic languages: word-final ē shortened to a in East and West Germanic but to i in Old Norse, and word-final ō shortened to a in Gothic but to o (probably ) in early North and West Germanic, with a later raising to u (the sixth century Salic law still has  in late Frankish).

The shortened overlong vowels in final position developed as regular long vowels from that point on, including the lowering of ē to ā in North and West Germanic. The monophthongization of unstressed au in Northwest Germanic produced a phoneme which merged with this new word-final long ō, while the monophthongization of unstressed ai produced a new ē which did not merge with original ē, but rather with ē₂, as it was not lowered to ā. This split, combined with the asymmetric development in West Germanic, with ē lowering but ō raising, points to an early difference in the articulation height of the two vowels that was not present in North Germanic. It could be seen as evidence that the lowering of ē to ā began in West Germanic at a time when final vowels were still long, and spread to North Germanic through the late Germanic dialect continuum, but only reaching the latter after the vowels had already been shortened.

ē₁ and ē₂

ē₂ is uncertain as a phoneme and only reconstructed from a small number of words; it is posited by the comparative method because whereas all provable instances of inherited (PIE)  (PGmc. ) are distributed in Gothic as ē and the other Germanic languages as *ā, all the Germanic languages agree on some occasions of ē (e.g., Goth/OE/ON  'here' ← late PGmc. ). Gothic makes no orthographic and therefore presumably no phonetic distinction between ē₁ and ē₂, but the existence of two Proto-Germanic long e-like phonemes is supported by the existence of two e-like Elder Futhark runes, Ehwaz and Eihwaz.

Krahe treats ē₂ (secondary ē) as identical with ī. It probably continues PIE ēi, and it may have been in the process of transition from a diphthong to a long simple vowel in the Proto-Germanic period. Lehmann lists the following origins for ē₂:
 ēi: Old High German ,  'ham', Goth  'side, flank' ← PGmc  ←  ← PIE *-.
 ea: The preterite of class 7 strong verbs with ai, al or an plus a consonant, or ē₁; e.g. OHG  'to plow' ←  vs. preterite iar, ier ← 
 iz, after loss of -z: OEng , OHG  'reward' (vs. OEng , Goth ) ← PGmc  ←  ← PIE *.
 Certain pronominal forms, e.g. OEng , OHG  'here' ← PGmc , derivative of - 'this' ← PIE * 'this'
 Words borrowed from Latin ē or e in the root syllable after a certain period (older loans also show ī).

Nasal vowels

Proto-Germanic developed nasal vowels from two sources. The earlier and much more frequent source was word-final -n (from PIE -n or -m) in unstressed syllables, which at first gave rise to short -ą, -į, -ų, long -į̄, -ę̄, -ą̄, and overlong -ę̂, -ą̂. -ę̄ and -ę̂ then merged into -ą̄ and -ą̂, which later developed into -ǭ and -ǫ̂. Another source, developing only in late Proto-Germanic times, was in the sequences -inh-, -anh-, -unh-, in which the nasal consonant lost its occlusion and was converted into lengthening and nasalisation of the preceding vowel, becoming -ą̄h-, -į̄h-, -ų̄h- (still written as -anh-, -inh-, -unh- in this article).

In many cases, the nasality was not contrastive and was merely present as an additional surface articulation. No Germanic language that preserves the word-final vowels has their nasality preserved. Word-final short nasal vowels do not show different reflexes compared to non-nasal vowels. However, the comparative method does require a three-way phonemic distinction between word-final *-ō, *-ǭ and *-ōn, which each has a distinct pattern of reflexes in the later Germanic languages:

When the vowels were shortened and denasalised, these two vowels no longer had the same place of articulation, and did not merge: -ō became  (later ) while -ǭ became  (later ). This allowed their reflexes to stay distinct.

The nasality of word-internal vowels (from -nh-) was more stable, and survived into the early dialects intact.

Phonemic nasal vowels definitely occurred in Proto-Norse and Old Norse. They were preserved in Old Icelandic down to at least  1125, the earliest possible time for the creation of the First Grammatical Treatise, which documents nasal vowels. The PG nasal vowels from -nh- sequences were preserved in Old Icelandic as shown by examples given in the First Grammatical Treatise. For example:
  'shark' <  < PG 
  'younger' <  < PG  (cf. Gothic )
The phonemicity is evident from minimal pairs like  'younger' vs.  'vex' < , cognate with English weary. The inherited Proto-Germanic nasal vowels were joined in Old Norse by nasal vowels from other sources, e.g. loss of *n before s. Modern Elfdalian still includes nasal vowels that directly derive from Old Norse, e.g.  'goose' < Old Norse  (presumably nasalized, although not so written); cf. German , showing the original consonant.

Similar surface (possibly phonemic) nasal/non-nasal contrasts occurred in the West Germanic languages down through Proto-Anglo-Frisian of  400 or so. Proto-Germanic medial nasal vowels were inherited, but were joined by new nasal vowels resulting from the Ingvaeonic nasal spirant law, which extended the loss of nasal consonants (only before -h- in Proto-Germanic) to all environments before a fricative (thus including -mf-, -nþ- and -ns- as well). The contrast between nasal and non-nasal long vowels  is reflected in the differing output of nasalized long *ą̄, which was raised to ō in Old English and Old Frisian whereas non-nasal *ā appeared as fronted ǣ. Hence:
 English goose, West Frisian , North Frisian  < Old English/Frisian  < Anglo-Frisian  < Proto-Germanic 
 En tooth < Old English , Old Frisian  < Anglo-Frisian  < Proto-Germanic 
 En brought, WFris  < Old English , Old Frisian  < Anglo-Frisian  < Proto-Germanic  (the past participle of ).

Phonotactics
Proto-Germanic allowed any single consonant to occur in one of three positions: initial, medial and final. However, clusters could only consist of two consonants unless followed by a suffix, and only certain clusters were possible in certain positions.

It allowed the following clusters in initial and medial position:
 Non-dental obstruent + l: pl, kl, fl, hl, sl, bl, gl, wl
 Non-alveolar obstruent + r: pr, tr, kr, fr, þr, hr, br, dr, gr, wr
 Non-labial obstruent + w: tw, dw, kw, þw, hw, sw
 Voiceless velar + n, s + nasal: kn, hn, sm, sn

It allowed the following clusters in medial position only:
 tl
 Liquid + w: lw, rw
 Geminates: pp, tt, kk, ss, bb, dd, gg, mm, nn, ll, rr, jj, ww
 Consonant + j: pj, tj, kj, fj, þj, hj, zj, bj, dj, gj, mj, nj, lj, rj, wj

It allowed continuant + obstruent clusters in medial and final position only:
 Fricative + obstruent: ft, ht, fs, hs, zd
 Nasal + obstruent: mp, mf, ms, mb, nt, nk, nþ, nh, ns, nd, ng (however nh was simplified to h, with nasalisation and lengthening of the previous vowel, in late Proto-Germanic)
 Liquid + obstruent: lp, lt, lk, lf, lþ, lh, ls, lb, ld, lg, lm, rp, rt, rk, rf, rþ, rh, rs, rb, rd, rg, rm, rn

The s + voiceless plosive clusters, sp, st, sk, could appear in any position in a word.

Later developments
Due to the emergence of a word-initial stress accent, vowels in unstressed syllables were gradually reduced over time, beginning at the very end of the Proto-Germanic period and continuing into the history of the various dialects. Vowels in third syllables were also generally lost before dialect diversification began, such as final -i of some present tense verb endings, and in -maz and -miz of the dative plural ending and first person plural present of verbs.

Word-final short nasal vowels were however preserved longer, as is reflected in Proto-Norse which still preserved word-final -ą ( on the Gallehus horns), while the dative plural appears as -mz ( on the Stentoften Runestone). Somewhat greater reduction is found in Gothic, which lost all final-syllable short vowels except u. Old High German and Old English initially preserved unstressed i and u, but later lost them in long-stemmed words and then Old High German lost them in many short-stemmed ones as well, by analogy.

Old English shows indirect evidence that word-final -ą was preserved into the separate history of the language. This can be seen in the infinitive ending -an (< ) and the strong past participle ending -en (< ). Therefore, the Anglo-Frisian brightening must necessarily have occurred very early in the history of the Anglo-Frisian languages, before the loss of final -ą.

The outcome of final vowels and combinations in the various daughters is shown in the table below:

Note that some Proto-Germanic endings have merged in all of the literary languages but are still distinct in runic Proto-Norse, e.g. *-īz vs. *-ijaz ( 'three daughters' in the Tune stone vs. the name  in the Gallehus horns).

Morphology

Reconstructions are tentative and multiple versions with varying degrees of difference exist. All reconstructed forms are marked with an asterisk (*).

It is often asserted that the Germanic languages have a highly reduced system of inflections as compared with Greek, Latin, or Sanskrit. Although this is true to some extent, it is probably due more to the late time of attestation of Germanic than to any inherent "simplicity" of the Germanic languages. As an example, there are less than 500 years between the Gothic Gospels of 360 and the Old High German Tatian of 830, yet Old High German, despite being the most archaic of the West Germanic languages, is missing a large number of archaic features present in Gothic, including dual and passive markings on verbs, reduplication in Class VII strong verb past tenses, the vocative case, and second-position (Wackernagel's Law) clitics. Many more archaic features may have been lost between the Proto-Germanic of 200 BC or so and the attested Gothic language. Furthermore, Proto-Romance and Middle Indic of the fourth century AD—contemporaneous with Gothic—were significantly simpler than Latin and Sanskrit, respectively, and overall probably no more archaic than Gothic. In addition, some parts of the inflectional systems of Greek, Latin, and Sanskrit were innovations that were not present in Proto-Indo-European.

General morphological features
Proto-Germanic had six cases, three genders, three numbers, three moods (indicative, subjunctive (PIE optative), imperative), and two voices (active and passive (PIE middle)). This is quite similar to the state of Latin, Greek, and Middle Indic of  AD 200.

Nouns and adjectives were declined in (at least) six cases: vocative, nominative, accusative, dative, instrumental, genitive. The locative case had merged into the dative case, and the ablative may have merged with either the genitive, dative or instrumental cases. However, sparse remnants of the earlier locative and ablative cases are visible in a few pronominal and adverbial forms. Pronouns were declined similarly, although without a separate vocative form. The instrumental and vocative can be reconstructed only in the singular; the instrumental survives only in the West Germanic languages, and the vocative only in Gothic.

Verbs and pronouns had three numbers: singular, dual, and plural. Although the pronominal dual survived into all the oldest languages, the verbal dual survived only into Gothic, and the (presumed) nominal and adjectival dual forms were lost before the oldest records. As in the Italic languages, it may have been lost before Proto-Germanic became a different branch at all.

Consonant and vowel alternations
Several sound changes occurred in the history of Proto-Germanic that were triggered only in some environments but not in others. Some of these were grammaticalised while others were still triggered by phonetic rules and were partially allophonic or surface filters.

Probably the most far-reaching alternation was between [*f, *þ, *s, *h, *hw] and [*b, *d, *z, *g, *gw], the voiceless and voiced fricatives, known as Grammatischer Wechsel and triggered by the earlier operation of Verner's law. It was found in various environments:
 In the person-and-number endings of verbs, which were voiceless in weak verbs and voiced in strong verbs.
 Between different grades of strong verbs. The voiceless alternants appeared in the present and past singular indicative, the voiced alternants in the remaining past tense forms.
 Between strong verbs (voiceless) and causative verbs derived from them (voiced).
 Between verbs and derived nouns.
 Between the singular and plural forms of some nouns.

Another form of alternation was triggered by the Germanic spirant law, which continued to operate into the separate history of the individual daughter languages. It is found in environments with suffixal -t, including:
 The second-person singular past ending *-t of strong verbs.
 The past tense of weak verbs with no vowel infix in the past tense.
 Nouns derived from verbs by means of the suffixes *-tiz, *-tuz, *-taz, which also possessed variants in -þ- and -d- when not following an obstruent.

An alternation not triggered by sound change was Sievers' law, which caused alternation of suffixal -j- and -ij- depending on the length of the preceding part of the morpheme. If preceded within the same morpheme by only short vowel followed by a single consonant, -j- appeared. In all other cases, such as when preceded by a long vowel or diphthong, by two or more consonants, or by more than one syllable, -ij- appeared. The distinction between morphemes and words is important here, as the alternant -j- appeared also in words that contained a distinct suffix that in turn contained -j- in its second syllable. A notable example was the verb suffix *-atjaną, which retained -j- despite being preceded by two syllables in a fully formed word.

Related to the above was the alternation between -j- and -i-, and likewise between -ij- and -ī-. This was caused by the earlier loss of -j- before -i-, and appeared whenever an ending was attached to a verb or noun with an -(i)j- suffix (which were numerous). Similar, but much more rare, was an alternation between -aV- and -aiC- from the loss of -j- between two vowels, which appeared in the present subjunctive of verbs: *-aų < *-ajų in the first person, *-ai- in the others. A combination of these two effects created an alternation between -ā- and -ai- found in class 3 weak verbs, with -ā- < -aja- < -əja- and -ai- < -əi- < -əji-.

I-mutation was the most important source of vowel alternation, and continued well into the history of the individual daughter languages (although it was either absent or not apparent in Gothic). In Proto-Germanic, only -e- was affected, which was raised by -i- or -j- in the following syllable. Examples are numerous:
 Verb endings beginning with -i-: present second and third person singular, third person plural.
 Noun endings beginning with -i- in u-stem nouns: dative singular, nominative and genitive plural.
 Causatives derived from strong verbs with a -j- suffix.
 Verbs derived from nouns with a -j- suffix.
 Nouns derived from verbs with a -j- suffix.
 Nouns and adjectives derived with a variety of suffixes including -il-, -iþō, -į̄, -iskaz, -ingaz.

Nouns
The system of nominal declensions was largely inherited from PIE. Primary nominal declensions were the stems in /a/, /ō/, /n/, /i/, and /u/. The first three were particularly important and served as the basis of adjectival declension; there was a tendency for nouns of all other classes to be drawn into them. The first two had variants in /ja/ and /wa/, and /jō/ and /wō/, respectively; originally, these were declined exactly like other nouns of the respective class, but later sound changes tended to distinguish these variants as their own subclasses. The /n/ nouns had various subclasses, including /ōn/ (masculine and feminine), /an/ (neuter), and /īn/ (feminine, mostly abstract nouns). There was also a smaller class of root nouns (ending in various consonants), nouns of relationship (ending in /er/), and neuter nouns in /z/ (this class was greatly expanded in German). Present participles, and a few nouns, ended in /nd/. The neuter nouns of all classes differed from the masculines and feminines in their nominative and accusative endings, which were alike.

Adjectives
Adjectives agree with the noun they qualify in case, number, and gender. Adjectives evolved into strong and weak declensions, originally with indefinite and definite meaning, respectively. As a result of its definite meaning, the weak form came to be used in the daughter languages in conjunction with demonstratives and definite articles. The terms strong and weak are based on the later development of these declensions in languages such as German and Old English, where the strong declensions have more distinct endings. In the proto-language, as in Gothic, such terms have no relevance. The strong declension was based on a combination of the nominal /a/ and /ō/ stems with the PIE pronominal endings; the weak declension was based on the nominal /n/ declension.

Determiners
Proto-Germanic originally had two demonstratives (proximal // 'this', distal // 'that') which could serve as both adjectives and pronouns. The proximal was already obsolescent in Gothic (e.g. Goth acc. , dat. , neut. ) and appears entirely absent in North Germanic. In the West Germanic languages, it evolved into a third-person pronoun, displacing the inherited *iz in the northern languages while being ousted itself in the southern languages (i.e. Old High German). This is the basis of the distinction between English him/her (with h- from the original proximal demonstrative) and German / (lacking h-).

Ultimately, only the distal survived in the function of demonstrative. In most languages, it developed a second role as definite article, and underlies both the English determiners the and that. In the North-West Germanic languages (but not in Gothic), a new proximal demonstrative ('this' as opposed to 'that') evolved by appending -si to the distal demonstrative (e.g. Runic Norse nom.sg. , gen. , dat. ), with complex subsequent developments in the various daughter languages. The new demonstrative underlies the English determiners this, these and those. (Originally, these, those were dialectal variants of the masculine plural of this.)

Verbs

Proto-Germanic had only two tenses (past and present), compared to 5–7 in Greek, Latin, Proto-Slavic and Sanskrit. Some of this difference is due to deflexion, featured by a loss of tenses present in Proto-Indo-European. For example, Donald Ringe assumes for Proto-Germanic an early loss of the PIE imperfect aspect (something that also occurred in most other branches), followed by merging of the aspectual categories present-aorist and the mood categories indicative-subjunctive. (This assumption allows him to account for cases where Proto-Germanic has present indicative verb forms that look like PIE aorist subjunctives.)

However, many of the tenses of the other languages (e.g. future, future perfect, pluperfect, Latin imperfect) are not cognate with each other and represent separate innovations in each language.  For example, the Greek future uses a -s- ending, apparently derived from a desiderative construction that in PIE was part of the system of derivational morphology (not the inflectional system); the Sanskrit future uses a -sy- ending, from a different desiderative verb construction and often with a different ablaut grade from Greek; while the Latin future uses endings derived either from the PIE subjunctive or from the PIE verb * 'to be'.  Similarly, the Latin imperfect and pluperfect stem from Italic innovations and are not cognate with the corresponding Greek or Sanskrit forms; and while the Greek and Sanskrit pluperfect tenses appear cognate, there are no parallels in any other Indo-European languages, leading to the conclusion that this tense is either a shared Greek-Sanskrit innovation or separate, coincidental developments in the two languages. In this respect, Proto-Germanic can be said to be characterized by the failure to innovate new synthetic tenses as much as the loss of existing tenses. Later Germanic languages did innovate new tenses, derived through periphrastic constructions, with Modern English likely possessing the most elaborated tense system ("Yes, the house will still be being built a month from now"). On the other hand, even the past tense was later lost (or widely lost) in most High German dialects as well as in Afrikaans.

Verbs in Proto-Germanic were divided into two main groups, called "strong" and "weak", according to the way the past tense is formed.  Strong verbs use ablaut (i.e. a different vowel in the stem) and/or reduplication (derived primarily from the Proto-Indo-European perfect), while weak verbs use a dental suffix (now generally held to be a reflex of the reduplicated imperfect of PIE  originally 'put', in Germanic 'do').  Strong verbs were divided into seven main classes while weak verbs were divided into five main classes (although no attested language has more than four classes of weak verbs). Strong verbs generally have no suffix in the present tense, although some have a -j- suffix that is a direct continuation of the PIE -y- suffix, and a few have an -n- suffix or infix that continues the -n- infix of PIE.  Almost all weak verbs have a present-tense suffix, which varies from class to class.   An additional small, but very important, group of verbs formed their present tense from the PIE perfect (and their past tense like weak verbs); for this reason, they are known as preterite-present verbs.  All three of the previously mentioned groups of verbs—strong, weak and preterite-present—are derived from PIE thematic verbs; an additional very small group derives from PIE athematic verbs, and one verb  'to want' forms its present indicative from the PIE optative mood.

Proto-Germanic verbs have three moods: indicative, subjunctive and imperative.  The subjunctive mood derives from the PIE optative mood.  Indicative and subjunctive moods are fully conjugated throughout the present and past, while the imperative mood existed only in the present tense and lacked first-person forms.  Proto-Germanic verbs have two voices, active and passive, the latter deriving from the PIE mediopassive voice.  The Proto-Germanic passive existed only in the present tense (an inherited feature, as the PIE perfect had no mediopassive).  On the evidence of Gothic—the only Germanic language with a reflex of the Proto-Germanic passive—the passive voice had a significantly reduced inflectional system, with a single form used for all persons of the dual and plural.  Note that although Old Norse (like modern Faroese and Icelandic) has an inflected mediopassive, it is not inherited from Proto-Germanic, but is an innovation formed by attaching the reflexive pronoun to the active voice.

Although most Proto-Germanic strong verbs are formed directly from a verbal root, weak verbs are generally derived from an existing noun, verb or adjective (so-called denominal, deverbal and deadjectival verbs).  For example, a significant subclass of Class I weak verbs are (deverbal) causative verbs.  These are formed in a way that reflects a direct inheritance from the PIE causative class of verbs.  PIE causatives were formed by adding an accented suffix -éi̯e/éi̯o to the o-grade of a non-derived verb.  In Proto-Germanic, causatives are formed by adding a suffix -j/ij- (the reflex of PIE -éi̯e/éi̯o) to the past-tense ablaut (mostly with the reflex of PIE o-grade) of a strong verb (the reflex of PIE non-derived verbs), with Verner's Law voicing applied (the reflex of the PIE accent on the -éi̯e/éi̯o suffix).  Examples:
  (class 1) 'to bite' →  'to bridle, yoke, restrain', i.e. 'to make bite down'
  (class 1) 'to rise' →  'to raise', i.e. 'to cause to rise'
  (class 2) 'to bend' →  'to bend (transitive)'
  (class 3) 'to burn' →  'to burn (transitive)'
  (class 3) 'to perish' →  'to destroy', i.e. 'to cause to perish'
  (class 5) 'to survive' →  'to save', i.e. 'to cause to survive'
  (class 5) 'to lie down' →  'to lay', i.e. 'to cause to lie down'
  (class 6) 'to travel, go' →  'to lead, bring', i.e. 'to cause to go',  'to carry across', i.e. 'to cause to travel' (an archaic instance of the o-grade ablaut used despite the differing past-tense ablaut)
  (class 7) 'to weep' →  'to cause to weep'
  (class 1, preterite-present) '(s)he knows'  →  'to teach', i.e. 'to cause to know'

As in other Indo-European languages, a verb in Proto-Germanic could have a preverb attached to it, modifying its meaning (cf. e.g.  'to perish', derived from  'to become').  In Proto-Germanic, the preverb was still a clitic that could be separated from the verb (as also in Gothic, as shown by the behavior of second-position clitics, e.g.  'and then he seized', with clitics  'and' and  'then' interpolated into  'he seized') rather than a bound morpheme that is permanently attached to the verb.  At least in Gothic, preverbs could also be stacked one on top of the other (similar to Sanskrit, different from Latin), e.g.  'to reconcile'.

An example verb:  'to take' (class 4 strong verb).

Pronouns

Schleicher's PIE fable rendered into Proto-Germanic
August Schleicher wrote a fable in the PIE language he had just reconstructed, which, though it has been updated a few times by others, still bears his name. Below is a rendering of this fable into Proto-Germanic.

The first is a direct phonetic evolution of the PIE text. It does not take into account various idiomatic and grammatical shifts that occurred over the period. For example, the original text uses the imperfect tense, which disappeared in Proto-Germanic. The second version takes these differences into account, and is therefore closer to the language the Germanic people would have actually spoken.

Reconstructed Proto-Germanic, phonetic evolution derived from reconstructed PIE only

Reconstructed Proto-Germanic, with more probable grammar and vocabulary derived from later Germanic languages

English

See also
 Pre-Indo-European (disambiguation)
 Holtzmann's law
 Suebi

Notes

References

Sources
 
 
 Euler, Wolfram & Konrad Badenheuer (2021). Sprache und Herkunft der Germanen. Abriss des Frühurgermanischen vor der Ersten Lautverschiebung [Language and Origin of the Germanic Peoples: Compendium of the Early Proto-Germanic Language prior to the First Sound Shift], 2nd edn., Berlin - London: Inspiration Un, 271p., in German with English summary .
 
 
 
 Fulk, R. D. A Comparative Grammar of the Early Germanic Languages. Amsterdam/Philadelphia: John Benjamins, 2018.
 
 
 Kapović, Mate, ed. The Indo-European Languages, 2nd edn. London: Routledge, 2017. .
 Krahe, Hans & Wolfgang Meid. Germanische Sprachwissenschaft, 2 vols. Berlin: de Gruyter, 1969.
 

 

 

 
 
 

 
 Ringe, Donald A. (2017). A History of English, vol. 1: From Proto-Indo-European to Proto-Germanic, 2nd edn. Oxford: Oxford University Press, (1st edn. 2006).

External links
 W.P. Lehmann & J. Slocum (eds.) A Grammar of Proto-Germanic (Online version)
 Proto-Germanic nominal and pronominal paradigms
 A dictionary of Proto-Germanic (in German)
 Another dictionary of Proto-Germanic
 Charles Prescott. "Germanic and the Ruki Dialects"
 Table: Germanic & PIE -ia and -ja stems compared across reference sources

Germanic languages
Pre-Roman Iron Age
Germanic